This is a summary of 1986 in music in the United Kingdom, including the official charts from that year.

Summary
The first number 1 single of 1986 was the breakthrough hit for London synthpop duo the Pet Shop Boys. Their song "West End Girls" had climbed the charts during late 1985 and reached number 1 for two weeks in January. They would have three more top 20 hits this year as well as two top 20 albums, and were still reaching the top 10 in 2006, twenty years later. Another popular synthpop duo this year were Erasure, with their song "Sometimes" reaching number two in the autumn; this success would be followed by many more hits throughout the decade.

After four successful years, the band Wham! split up in the spring. Made up of George Michael and Andrew Ridgeley, they finished with a farewell concert at Wembley Stadium, a greatest hits album The Final which reached number 2, and the single "The Edge of Heaven", their fourth number one, and their last until "Last Christmas" finally reached No. 1 in 2021. George Michael also reached number 1 this year with a solo release, A Different Corner, and went on to have a highly successful solo career.

The formation of the charity Comic Relief provided an unusual song from Cliff Richard, a singer with several huge hits in the 1950s and '60s. He teamed up with the cast of the popular sitcom The Young Ones (itself named after a Richard song) for a new version of his 1959 single "Living Doll", half sung by Richard and half shouted by the Young Ones cast. With proceeds going to the charity, it reached number one for three weeks and was Richard's first number 1 of the decade. Another novelty number one was "The Chicken Song", sung by the cast of satirical puppet show Spitting Image. With lyrics such as "Hold a chicken in the air, stick a deckchair up your nose" it was intended as a parody of novelty holiday songs which were popular at the time, and also topped the chart for three weeks.

American singer Madonna had the biggest-selling album of the year with "True Blue". All singles released from it made the top five, including the number 1s "Papa Don't Preach", "True Blue", and "La Isla Bonita" which topped the chart the year after. The biggest-selling single of the year went to The Communards, with a hi-NRG cover of the disco song "Don't Leave Me This Way". The band included singer Jimmy Somerville who had previously enjoyed success with Bronski Beat, and later started a solo career.

The Christmas number one single was something of a surprise, a re-issue of Jackie Wilson's 1957 single "Reet Petite". Wilson had died in 1984, but the song been re-issued after being used in a television advert for Levi's, with a new video made of a Claymation version of Wilson. Having first been released 29 years earlier, it broke the record for the longest time between a single being released and it hitting number 1, a record that would last until 2005 when Tony Christie's 1971 song "(Is This the Way to) Amarillo" topped the chart.

The Orchestra of the Age of Enlightenment was founded in London by a group of period music enthusiasts, going on to become one of the UK's leading orchestras.  Harrison Birtwistle's innovative opera, The Mask of Orpheus, was premièred in London, to great critical acclaim.  Michael Nyman also came up with a new opera, The Man Who Mistook His Wife for a Hat, a chamber work with a minimalist score.

Events
January - The Adrian Boult Hall is opened at Birmingham Conservatoire by the Duchess of Gloucester.
15 March – "Heartbeat '86", a charity concert for the Birmingham Children's Hospital, is held at the NEC. Performers include Roy Wood, UB40, The Moody Blues,  Electric Light Orchestra and Robert Plant. George Harrison makes a surprise appearance playing Johnny B. Goode with everyone at the end of the show.
11 April - The Chart Show debuts on Channel 4.
7 June - Queen start The Magic Tour, which becomes their final tour with all original members and also their most successful tour.
28 June - Wham! perform a final concert at London's Wembley Stadium just before their split.  It is attended by 72,000 people.  
27 October - Michael Nyman's chamber opera The Man Who Mistook His Wife for a Hat is premiered at the Institute of Contemporary Arts, London.

Charts

Number one singles

Number one albums

Year-end charts

Best-selling singles
Based on sales from 30 December 1985 to 3 January 1987.

Best-selling albums
Based on sales from 29 December 1985 to 3 January 1987.

Notes:

Classical music: new works
Malcolm Arnold - Symphony No. 9
Harrison Birtwistle - Earth Dances
Arthur Butterworth - Symphony No. 4
Andrew Downes - The Marshes of Glynn
Alun Hoddinott - Concerto for Orchestra
Arwel Hughes - Gloria Patri
Daniel Jones - Cello Concerto

Opera
Harrison Birtwistle - Yan Tan Tethera
Michael Nyman - The Man who Mistook his Wife for a Hat

Musical films
Shanghai Surprise, starring Madonna

Births
6 January - Alex Turner, singer, musician, (Arctic Monkeys), (The Last Shadow Puppets)
21 February - Charlotte Church, singer
12 March - Danny Jones, singer, (McFly)
23 April - Laura Mvula, singer
7 May - Matt Helders, drummer, (Arctic Monkeys)
14 July -  Dan Smith, singer-songwriter (Bastille)
21 July - Rebecca Ferguson, singer-songwriter
21 September - Faris Badwan, singer, (The Horrors)
20 November — Oliver Sykes, heavy metal vocalist (Bring Me the Horizon)

Deaths
4 January - Phil Lynott, singer, musician, (Thin Lizzy), 36 (overdose)
27 January - Ken Moule, jazz pianist, 60
1 February - Dick James, singer and record producer, 65
14 February - Edmund Rubbra, composer, 84
3 April - Peter Pears, operatic tenor and partner of Benjamin Britten, 75
25 April - Fred Hunt, jazz pianist, 62
3 June - Anna Neagle, actress, singer and dancer, 81
26 June - William Lovelock, composer, 86
6 November - Eddie Thompson, jazz pianist, 61
16 December - Maurice Handford, horn player and conductor, 57 
date unknown
Myers Foggin, pianist and conductor, 77
Mark Lubbock, conductor and composer
Arthur Rosebery, pianist and singer

Music awards

BRIT Awards
The 1986 BRIT Awards winners were:

Best British producer: Dave Stewart
Best international solo artist: Bruce Springsteen
British Album: Phil Collins - No Jacket Required
British female solo artist: Annie Lennox
British group: Dire Straits
British male solo artist: Phil Collins
British Single: Tears for Fears - "Everybody Wants to Rule the World"
British Video: Paul Young - "Everytime You Go Away"
Best British Newcomer: Go West
International group: Huey Lewis and the News
Outstanding contribution: Wham! and Elton John (Joint Winners)

See also
 1986 in British radio
 1986 in British television
 1986 in the United Kingdom
 List of British films of 1986

References

External links
BBC Radio 1's Chart Show
The Official Charts Company

 
British music
British music by year